In cryptography, the McEliece cryptosystem is an asymmetric encryption algorithm developed in 1978 by Robert McEliece. It was the first such scheme to use randomization in the encryption process. The algorithm has never gained much acceptance in the cryptographic community, but is a candidate for "post-quantum cryptography", as it is immune to attacks using Shor's algorithm and – more generally – measuring coset states using Fourier sampling.

The algorithm is based on the hardness of decoding a general linear code (which is known to be NP-hard). For a description of the private key, an error-correcting code is selected for which an efficient decoding algorithm is known, and which is able to correct  errors. The original algorithm uses binary Goppa codes (subfield codes of geometric Goppa codes of a genus-0 curve over finite fields of characteristic 2); these codes can be efficiently decoded, thanks to an algorithm due to Patterson. The public key is derived from the private key by disguising the selected code as a general linear code.

Variants of this cryptosystem exist, using different types of codes. Most of them were proven less secure; they were broken by structural decoding.

McEliece with Goppa codes has resisted cryptanalysis so far. The most effective attacks known use information-set decoding algorithms. A 2008 paper describes both an attack and a fix. Another paper shows that for quantum computing, key sizes must be increased by a factor of four due to improvements in information set decoding.

The McEliece cryptosystem has some advantages over, for example, RSA. The encryption and decryption are faster. For a long time, it was thought that McEliece could not be used to produce signatures. However, a signature scheme can be constructed based on the Niederreiter scheme, the dual variant of the McEliece scheme. One of the main disadvantages of McEliece is that the private and public keys are large matrices. For a standard selection of parameters, the public key is 512 kilobits long.

Scheme definition
McEliece consists of three algorithms: a probabilistic key generation algorithm which produces a public and a private key, a probabilistic encryption algorithm, and a deterministic decryption algorithm.

All users in a McEliece deployment share a set of common security parameters: .

Key generation

The principle is that Alice chooses a linear code  from some family of codes for which she knows an efficient decoding algorithm, and to make  public knowledge but keep the decoding algorithm secret. Such a decoding algorithm requires not just knowing , in the sense of knowing an arbitrary generator matrix, but requires one to know the parameters used when specifying  in the chosen family of codes. For instance, for binary Goppa codes, this information would be the Goppa polynomial and the code locators.

More specifically, the steps are as follows:

Alice selects a binary -linear code  capable of (efficiently) correcting  errors from some large family of codes, e.g. binary Goppa codes. This choice should give rise to an efficient decoding algorithm . Any linear code has many generator matrices, but often there is a natural choice for this family of codes. Knowing this would reveal  so it should be kept secret.
Alice selects a random  binary non-singular matrix .
Alice selects a random  permutation matrix .
Alice computes the  matrix .
Note that  could be encoded and stored as the parameters used for selecting .

Message encryption 

Suppose Bob wishes to send a message m to Alice whose public key is :

Bob encodes the message  as a binary string of length .
Bob computes the vector .
Bob generates a random -bit vector  containing exactly  ones (a vector of length  and weight )

Message decryption 
Alice computes .
Alice computes .

Proof of message decryption 
Note that ,
and that  is a permutation matrix, thus  has weight .

Therefore, the correct code word  is obtained.

Multiplying with the inverse of  gives , which is the plain text message.

Key sizes 
Because there is a free choice in the matrix , it is common to express  in "systematic form" so that the last  columns correspond to the identity matrix . In its round 3 submission to the NIST post quantum standardization the highest level of security, level 5 is given for parameter sets 6688128, 6960119, and 8192128.

Attacks 
An attack consists of an adversary, who knows the public key  but not the private key, deducing the plaintext from some intercepted ciphertext . Such attempts should be infeasible.

There are two main branches of attacks for McEliece:

Brute-force / unstructured attacks 
The attacker knows  which is the generator matrix of an  code  which is combinatorially able to correct  errors.
The attacker may ignore the fact that  is really the obfuscation of a structured code chosen from a specific family, and instead just use an algorithm for decoding with any linear code. Several such algorithms exist, such as going through each codeword of the code, syndrome decoding, or information set decoding.

Decoding a general linear code, however, is known to be NP-hard, however, and all of the above-mentioned methods have exponential running time.

In 2008, Bernstein, Lange, and Peters described a practical attack on the original McEliece cryptosystem, using the information set decoding method by Stern.
Using the parameters originally suggested by McEliece, the attack could be carried out in 260.55 bit operations. Since the attack is embarrassingly parallel (no communication between nodes is necessary), it can be carried out in days on modest computer clusters.

Structural attacks 

Many code families have been proposed for McEliece, and most of them have been completely "broken" in the sense that attacks which recover an efficient decoding algorithm has been found, such as Reed-Solomon codes.

The originally proposed binary Goppa codes remain one of the few suggested families of codes which have largely resisted attempts at devising structural attacks.

Post-quantum encryption candidate 

A variant of this algorithm combined with NTS-KEM was entered into and selected during the third round of the NIST post-quantum encryption competition.

References

External links
 

 

  (Submission to the NIST Post-Quantum Cryptography Standardization Project)

Public-key encryption schemes
Code-based cryptography
Post-quantum cryptography